Hyperion , also known as Saturn VII, is a moon of Saturn discovered by William Cranch Bond, his son George Phillips Bond and William Lassell in 1848. It is distinguished by its irregular shape, its chaotic rotation, and its unexplained sponge-like appearance. It was the first non-round moon to be discovered.

Name 

The moon is named after Hyperion, the Titan god of watchfulness and observation – the elder brother of Cronus, the Greek equivalent of the Roman god Saturn. It is also designated Saturn VII. The adjectival form of the name is Hyperionian.

Hyperion's discovery came shortly after John Herschel had suggested names for the seven previously known satellites of Saturn in his 1847 publication Results of Astronomical Observations made at the Cape of Good Hope. William Lassell, who saw Hyperion two days after William Bond, had already endorsed Herschel's naming scheme and suggested the name Hyperion in accordance with it. He also beat Bond to publication.

Physical characteristics

Shape 

Hyperion is one of the largest bodies known to be highly irregularly shaped (non-ellipsoidal, i.e. not in hydrostatic equilibrium) in the Solar System. The only larger moon known to be irregular in shape is Neptune's moon Proteus. Hyperion has about 15% of the mass of Mimas, the least massive known ellipsoidal body. A possible explanation for the irregular shape is that Hyperion is a fragment of a larger body that was broken up by a large impact in the distant past. A proto-Hyperion could have been  in diameter (which ranges from a little below the size of Mimas to a little below the size of Tethys). Over about 1,000 years, ejecta from a presumed Hyperion breakup would have impacted Titan at low speeds, building up volatiles in the atmosphere of Titan.

Composition 

Like most of Saturn's moons, Hyperion's low density indicates that it is composed largely of water ice with only a small amount of rock. It is thought that Hyperion may be similar to a loosely accreted pile of rubble in its physical composition. However, unlike most of Saturn's moons, Hyperion has a low albedo (0.2–0.3), indicating that it is covered by at least a thin layer of dark material. This may be material from Phoebe (which is much darker) that got past Iapetus. Hyperion is redder than Phoebe and closely matches the color of the dark material on Iapetus.

Hyperion has a porosity of about 0.46. Although Hyperion is the eighth-largest moon of Saturn, it is only the ninth-most massive. Phoebe has a smaller radius, although it is more massive than Hyperion and thus denser.

Surface features 

Voyager 2 passed through the Saturn system, but photographed Hyperion only from a distance. It discerned individual craters and an enormous ridge, but was not able to make out the texture of Hyperion's surface. Early images from the Cassini orbiter suggested an unusual appearance, but it was not until Cassini'''s first targeted flyby of Hyperion on 25 September 2005 that Hyperion's oddness was revealed in full.

Hyperion's surface is covered with deep, sharp-edged craters that give it the appearance of a giant sponge. Dark material fills the bottom of each crater. The reddish substance contains long chains of carbon and hydrogen and appears very similar to material found on other Saturnian satellites, most notably Iapetus. Scientists attribute Hyperion's unusual, sponge-like appearance to the fact that it has an unusually low density for such a large object. Its low density makes Hyperion quite porous, with a weak surface gravity. These characteristics mean impactors tend to compress the surface, rather than excavating it, and most material that is blown off the surface never returns.

The latest analyses of data obtained by Cassini during its flybys of Hyperion in 2005 and 2006 show that about 40 percent of it is empty space. It was suggested in July 2007 that this porosity allows craters to remain nearly unchanged over the eons. The new analyses also confirmed that Hyperion is composed mostly of water ice with very little rock.

 Rotation 

The Voyager 2 images and subsequent ground-based photometry indicated that Hyperion's rotation is chaotic, that is, its axis of rotation wobbles so much that its orientation in space is unpredictable. Its Lyapunov time is around 30 days. Hyperion, together with Pluto's moons Nix and Hydra, is among only a few moons in the Solar System known to rotate chaotically, although it is expected to be common in binary asteroids. It is also the only regular planetary natural satellite in the Solar System known not to be tidally locked.

Hyperion is unique among the large moons in that it is very irregularly shaped, has a fairly eccentric orbit, and is near a much larger moon, Titan. These factors combine to restrict the set of conditions under which a stable rotation is possible. The 3:4 orbital resonance between Titan and Hyperion may also make a chaotic rotation more likely. The fact that its rotation is not locked probably accounts for the relative uniformity of Hyperion's surface, in contrast to many of Saturn's other moons, which have contrasting trailing and leading hemispheres.

 Exploration 

Hyperion has been imaged several times from moderate distances by the Cassini orbiter.

See also 
 Chaotic rotation
 Hyperion in fiction
 Moons of Saturn
 List of geological features on Hyperion

Notes

References

External links 

 Cassini mission Hyperion page
  at NASA's Solar System Exploration site
 The Planetary Society: Hyperion
 NASA: Saturn's Hyperion, A Moon With Odd Craters
 Cassini images of Hyperion 
 Images of Hyperion at JPL's Planetary Photojournal
 Hyperion nomenclature from the USGS planetary nomenclature page

 
Moons of Saturn
Discoveries by William Cranch Bond
18480916
Chaotic maps
Moons with a prograde orbit